Governor Humphreys may refer to:

Benjamin G. Humphreys (1808–1882), 26th Governor of Mississippi
John Lisseter Humphreys (1881–1929), Governor of North Borneo from 1926 to 1929

See also
Lyman U. Humphrey (1844–1915), 11th Governor of Kansas